Laura Mixon Story Elvington is an American contemporary Christian music singer-songwriter. Billboard ranked her as the 40th Top Christian Artist of the 2010s. She has won a Grammy and six GMA Dove Awards. Her second studio album, Blessings, reached No. 1 on Top Christian Albums & Americana/Folk Albums (where it spent three weeks atop the charts), and peaked at No. 30 on the Billboard 200. It also achieved RIAA Gold status.

The title track off the album Blessings became her first No. 1 hit on the Billboard Christian Songs chart. The single eventually went on to win the 2012 Grammy Award for Best Contemporary Christian Music Song and achieved Platinum status in the United States.

Career
Story began her career in 1996 when she met Shane Williams, from the band Silers Bald, at Columbia International University. Williams asked Story to join the band and she became their bass player. Story released four independent albums with the band.

When the band was about to sign a deal with Essential Records, Story's manager suggested she record a solo album. In 2002, Story left Silers Bald and began working on her first album, Indescribable, released independently that same year. In 2004, the title track of her album was recorded by Chris Tomlin on his album Arriving. Tomlin's version peaked at No. 2 on Billboard'''s Hot Christian Songs and was included in the compilation album Passion: How Great Is Our God. The band Avalon also recorded a version of the song for the WOW Worship 2006 album.

Story released her second independent album in 2005, titled There Is Nothing. The album was produced by Ed Cash and Mitch Dane. During that year, she also married Martin Elvington, and moved to Atlanta, Georgia, to become an associate worship leader at Perimeter Church.

In 2006, Story signed a recording contract with INO Records and two years later released her third album, Great God Who Saves. The album also was produced by Ed Cash. In 2010, she was nominated for Female Vocalist of the Year at the 41st GMA Dove Awards. Story released her fourth album, Blessings, in May 2011, and her fifth studio album, God of Every Story, on September 30, 2013.

Blessings

In May 2011 Story released her fourth album, Blessings. To date, the album ranks as her biggest commercial success, having debuted at No. 2 on Billboard Christian Albums, giving Story her highest placement ever on the album chart. In June 2011, the first single off the album, also titled "Blessings", reached No. 1 on the Billboard Christian Songs chart, giving Story her first number one hit. In an interview, Story explains, "Blessings is just a bunch of songs about worshiping when life is hard". After her husband Martin Elvington was diagnosed with a brain tumor, she asked, "Why didn't you just fix it, God? You're all powerful and all loving… just fix it." Later, after Story mentioned her desire to return to a normal life, her sister responded, "You know, I think the detour is actually the road." Story realized, "Spending time with Martin obviously makes me happy, but it makes me a better person. That's the blessing of it."

After the success of Story's Grammy-winning song "Blessings", a 30-day devotional book was released entitled What If Your Blessings Come Through Raindrops? (Worthy Publishing, 2012 ). Each chapter contains thoughts, prayers and quotes along with a journaling page for readers to recall blessings they have seen in their own lives.

Discography
Solo albums

With Silers Bald

Singles"Blessings" also charted on the Billboard Heatseekers Song chart peaking at No. 18.

Awards and nominations

Grammy Awards

GMA Dove Awards

Bibliography

 What If Your Blessings Come Through Raindrops?, Worthy Publishing, 2012
 When God Doesn't Fix It'', Worthy Publishing, 2015

Notes

References

External links
 

American singer-songwriters
Living people
American women singer-songwriters
Christian music songwriters
American performers of Christian music
Performers of contemporary worship music
Fair Trade Services artists
Grammy Award winners
1978 births
21st-century American singers
21st-century American women singers